Saint John's Academy  is a CO-ED, day-cum-residential school situated at Mirzapur Road, Allahabad. It provides education from Pre-Nursery to Class XII and is affiliated to the Council for the Indian School Certificate Examinations., New Delhi.

History

Saint John's Academy was founded in 1993 by Mr. C. V. Innes, Mrs. D. Innes, Mrs. Shilpi Mitchell and Mr. Mitchell Innes under the "Society for Promotion of Education, Adventure Sports and Conservation of the Environment" (P.E.A.C.E.).

Facilities and extracurricular

The school  hosts "Invictus", a district level annual inter-school competition.

References

External links
 Official website

Boarding schools in Uttar Pradesh
Private schools in Uttar Pradesh
Primary schools in Uttar Pradesh
High schools and secondary schools in Uttar Pradesh
Schools in Allahabad
Educational institutions established in 1993
1993 establishments in Uttar Pradesh